Steve Reynolds may refer to:
 Steve Reynolds (singer-songwriter), Canadian singer-songwriter
 Steve Reynolds (sound engineer), New Orleans sound engineer
 Stephen Reynolds (writer) (1881–1919), English author
 Stephen Reynolds (director), Canadian television director
 Stephen Reynolds (footballer) (born 1992), Scottish football player
 Stephen Reynolds (artist) (born 1974), Australian artist
 Stephen P. Reynolds, astrophysicist